Olivier Damaisin (born 5 August 1966) is a French politician of La République En Marche! (LREM) who served as a member of the French National Assembly from 2017 to 2022, representing the department of Lot-et-Garonne.

In parliament, Damaisin served on the Finance Committee. In addition to his committee assignments, he was part of the French-Jamaican Parliamentary Friendship Group and the French-Gabonese Parliamentary Friendship Group.

Damaisin lost his seat in the first round of the 2022 French legislative election.

See also
 2017 French legislative election

References

1966 births
Living people
Deputies of the 15th National Assembly of the French Fifth Republic
La République En Marche! politicians

21st-century French politicians